Boling may refer to:

People with the surname
Zhang Boling
Alexis Boling (born 1979), American filmmaker and musician
Bodine Boling (born 1982), American writer and filmmaker
Clint Boling (born 1989), American football player
Dulcie Boling (born 1936), Australian businesswoman
John Boling (1895–1962), American racing driver
Lexi Boling (born 1993), American model
Matt Boling (born 2000), American track and field athlete
Kim Böling (born 1992), Finnish footballer

Places
 Boling County, a former county of the Eastern Han in Hebei, China
 Boling Principality, a former principality of the Western Jin Empire in Hebei, China
 Boling Commandery, a former medieval commandery with its seat variously at Raoyang, Anping, and Dingzhou in Hebei, China
 Boling, a census-designated place in Wharton County, Texas, United States

See also
 Boling-Boling Festival
 Cui clan of Boling